Alkohol is a 1919 German silent drama film directed by Ewald André Dupont and Alfred Lind and starring Wilhelm Diegelmann, Ernst Rückert, and Georg H. Schnell. The film was begun by Lind but finished by Dupont. It was his first major melodrama, and represented a breakthrough in his career. The film's theme and setting foreshadow much of his later work. It was one in a series of "Enlightenment films" examining social issues, which were produced around the time. It premiered at the Marmorhaus in Berlin.

Synopsis
A middle-class man falls in love with a woman from a more ordinary background, and they end up working in a variety act where they sink into alcoholism. He then kills another man who he mistakenly believes is a rival.

Cast
 Wilhelm Diegelmann
 Ernst Rückert
 Georg H. Schnell
 Emil Biron
 Jean Moreau
 Auguste Pünkösdy
 Ferry Sikla
 Toni Tetzlaff
 Hanni Weisse
 Maria Zelenka

References

Bibliography

External links

1919 films
Films of the Weimar Republic
German silent feature films
1919 drama films
German drama films
Films directed by E. A. Dupont
Films directed by Alfred Lind
Films about alcoholism
German black-and-white films
Silent drama films
1910s German films
1910s German-language films